Alejandro Javier Schiapparelli (born May 16, 1980) is a former Argentine football defender and the current manager for Sportivo Desamparados in the Torneo Argentino B.

Throughout his career he has also played for Almirante Brown, San Martín (SJ) and Quilmes in Argentina, Real Cartagena in Colombia, Deportivo Colonia in Uruguay, Deportes La Serena in Chile and Blooming, Bolívar and Oriente Petrolero from Bolivia.

Club titles

External links
 
 
 
 

1980 births
Living people
Footballers from Córdoba, Argentina
Association football defenders
Argentine footballers
Categoría Primera A players
Bolivian Primera División players
Argentine Primera División players
Uruguayan Primera División players
Club Almirante Brown footballers
Real Cartagena footballers
Club Blooming players
Club Bolívar players
Oriente Petrolero players
Quilmes Atlético Club footballers
Deportes La Serena footballers
San Martín de San Juan footballers
Argentine expatriate footballers
Expatriate footballers in Colombia
Argentine expatriate sportspeople in Uruguay
Expatriate footballers in Uruguay
Argentine expatriate sportspeople in Chile
Expatriate footballers in Chile
Argentine expatriate sportspeople in Bolivia
Expatriate footballers in Bolivia
Argentine expatriate sportspeople in Colombia